Chrysoritis chrysaor, the golden copper or burnished opal, is a butterfly of the family Lycaenidae. It is found in South Africa, where it is widespread in the east.

The wingspan is 22–27 mm for males and 23–30 mm for females. Adults are on the wing year-round with peaks in November and February at high altitudes.

The larvae feed on Tylecodon paniculatus, Cotyledon orbiculata, Zygophyllum sessilifolium, Z. retrofractum, Acacia karroo and Rhus species. They are attended to by Crematogaster liengmei ants.

References

Butterflies described in 1864
Chrysoritis
Endemic butterflies of South Africa
Taxa named by Roland Trimen